Marvin Louis Casey II (born 1981 in St. Louis, Missouri, United States), is an Israeli-American hip hop dancer, choreographer, dance instructor and actor.

Biography
Marvin Casey was born in St. Louis Missouri in 1981 and was involved primarily with baseball, football, and tae kwon do until he started dancing at the age of 17. He became further immersed in it at age 22 while working for Utopia entertainment company, dancing hip-hop on the dance floor almost every night.   
He converted to Judaism in 2003, and immigrated to Israel in 2006. He was married in Jerusalem on October 31, 2010. and lives with his wife, Oshrat, and 3 children in Ashkelon, Israel.

General references

Eli Levine, "Marvin’s Dance", Aish.com, March 16, 2014
Danna Harman, The Jewish African-American Who Brought Flash Mob Dancing to Israel, Haaretz, September 23, 2013
Yael Brygel, Cityfront: Dancing to a Different Tune, The Jerusalem Post, June 4, 2009 
 Leah Hakimian How Marvin met Oshrat, The New York Jewish Week, December 5, 2010

External links
 
 

Living people
1981 births
Israeli male dancers
American dancers
Israeli choreographers
American choreographers
People from St. Louis
Converts to Judaism
African-American Jews
African-American choreographers
21st-century African-American people
20th-century African-American people